Look at Me is a 2004 French drama-comedy film directed by Agnès Jaoui. It won the Best Screenplay award at the 2004 Cannes Film Festival. The film features a clip from the 1948 film Blood on the Moon.

Plot
Lolita Cassard lacks confidence and self-esteem because she doesn't look like the women who fill the pages of fashion magazines. Her father, Étienne Cassard, is a respected novelist, but rarely considers the feelings of others, only thinking of himself and worrying about aging. Pierre Millet, a younger writer, doubts he will ever be successful. Meanwhile, Sylvia Millet, a singing teacher, believes in her husband's talent, but doubts her own and that of her student, Lolita. When Sylvia discovers that Lolita is the daughter of Étienne, an author she admires, she befriends Lolita in order to gain access to Étienne for her husband's sake. Lolita does not see that Sylvia is just another person being generous to her because her father is famous. She begins to confide in Sylvia about her father, love life, and self-confidence issues. Sylvia takes a liking to Lolita and begins to see Étienne for the man he really is. Sébastien, a young journalist, befriends Lolita. He takes a liking to her, but she shows no interest, infatuated with another boy, Mathieu. Mathieu is interested in Lolita only because of her father and mistreats her. Lolita assumes the same of Sébastien and does not realize that he likes her for herself. After a crazy weekend at Étienne's cottage, Sylvia leaves Pierre because he has become like Étienne, Lolita realizes Sébastien has honest intentions, and Étienne is repeatedly reminded that he is an indifferent father to Lolita.

Cast
Marilou Berry – Lolita Cassard
Agnès Jaoui – Sylvia Millet
Jean-Pierre Bacri – Étienne Cassard
Laurent Grévill – Pierre Millet
Virginie Desarnauts – Karine Cassard
Keine Bouhiza – Sébastien
Grégoire Oestermann – Vincent
Serge Riaboukine – Félix
Michèle Moretti – Édith

Critical reception
The film was well received by the critics. Review aggregator Rotten Tomatoes reports that 87% of 98 critics gave it a positive review, for an average rating of 7.6/10. The site's consensus reads "An observant drama-comedy about self absorption."

References

External links
Official site

2004 films
2000s coming-of-age comedy-drama films
French coming-of-age comedy-drama films
2004 romantic comedy-drama films
Films directed by Agnès Jaoui
Sony Pictures Classics films
2004 comedy films
2004 drama films
French romantic comedy-drama films
2000s French films